William Kirby is a Gaelic footballer who plays with the Austin Stacks club and formerly with the Na Gaeil club in Tralee Co Kerry. He also played with the Kerry senior team winning All Irelands in 1997 & 2004. He also won Under 21 medals in 1995 & 1996. He also won 2 Sigerson Cup medals with Tralee IT in 1997 & 1998. Winning the Barrett Cup with Austin Stacks C team in 2019 is one of his finest achievements.

Club

Kirby first played with the Na Gaeil club in Tralee. He won a Kerry Novice Football Championship with the club in 1994. He also lined out with the St. Brendan's Divisional team in the Kerry Senior Football Championship.

He joined Austin Stacks in 1995 and has had a long career with them. Success was slow coming for Kirby. He lined out in the 2001 Kerry Senior Football Championship loss to An Ghaeltacht. His first success was a Kerry Club Football Championship title in 2003.

Honours
Barrett Cup: (1) 2019
All-Ireland Senior Football Championship: (2) 1997, 2004
National Football League: (2) 1997, 2004
Munster Senior Football Championship: (5)  1997, 1998, 2001, 2004, 2005
All-Ireland Under 21 Football Championship: (2) 1995, 1996
Munster Under 21 Football Championship: (2) 1995, 1996
Sigerson Cup: (2) 1997,1998
Munster Senior Club Football Championship: (1) 2014
Kerry Senior Football Championship: (1) 2014
Kerry Senior Club Football Championship: (2) 2003, 2016
Kerry Senior Co. League Division 1: (2) 2011, 2014
Kerry Senior Co. League Division 2: (1) 2010

References

Year of birth missing (living people)
Living people
Austin Stacks Gaelic footballers
Kerry inter-county Gaelic footballers
Winners of two All-Ireland medals (Gaelic football)